This is a list of United States ambassadors to Montenegro.

30-Oct-1905–27-Oct-1907 John Brinkerhoff Jackson, Resident at Athens  
20-May-1908–29-Jun-1909 Richmond Pearson, Resident at Athens  
31-May-1910–30-Sep-1912 George H. Moses, Resident at Athens  
21-Jul-1913–18-Aug-1913 Jacob Gould Schurman, Resident at Athens  
10-May-1914–28-Sep-1914 George Fred Williams, Resident at Athens  
Nov-1914–Dec-1918 Garrett Droppers, Resident at Athens; Montenegro absorbed into the Kingdom of the Serbs, Croats, and Slovenes on December 4, 1918  
1918–1992 See United States Ambassador to Yugoslavia    
1992–2006 See United States Ambassador to Serbia    
12-Sep-2007–8-Aug-2010 Roderick W. Moore   
27-Apr-2011–11-Feb-2015 Sue K. Brown
19-Feb-2015–24-July-2018 Margaret A. Uyehara
20-Dec-2018–present Judy Rising Reinke

See also
Montenegro – United States relations
Foreign relations of Montenegro
Ambassadors of the United States

References

United States Department of State: Background notes on Montenegro

External links
 United States Department of State: Chiefs of Mission for Montenegro
 United States Department of State: Montenegro
 United States Embassy in Podgorica

Montenegro

United States